"Banana Republic" was the first single from The Boomtown Rats' album Mondo Bongo. It peaked at number three in the UK Singles Chart.

Breaking from the band's previous new wave sound, the song opens with a ska-reggae hook (that repeats at the close of the much longer album version). However, the song itself is a more mainstream piece musically. The 'banana republic' which the song describes is actually a deliberately scathing portrait of the Republic of Ireland, the band's country of origin, and was written in response to the band being banned from performing there. This in turn was reputedly because of Geldof's "denunciation of nationalism, medieval-minded clerics and corrupt politicians" in a memorably controversial 1977 interview/performance on Ireland's The Late Late Show with Gay Byrne.

Charts

References

The Boomtown Rats songs
1980 singles
Song recordings produced by Tony Visconti
Songs about Ireland
1980 songs
Ensign Records singles
Columbia Records singles
Songs written by Pete Briquette
The Late Late Show (Irish talk show)